California Street may refer to:

 California Street (Huntsville), a major thoroughfare in Huntsville, Alabama
 California Street (San Francisco), a major thoroughfare in San Francisco, California